The Telegraph is an Indian English daily newspaper founded and continuously published in Kolkata since 7 July 1982. It is published by the ABP Group and the newspaper competes with The Times of India. The newspaper is the eighth most-widely read English language newspaper in India as per Indian Readership Survey (IRS) 2019.

The Telegraph has three editions Kolkata, South Bengal and North Bengal.

History
The Telegraph was founded on 7 July 1982. The design director of London's The Sunday Times, Edwin Taylor, designed the newspaper and provided a standard in design and editing. In 31 years, it has become the largest-circulation English daily in the eastern region published from Kolkata. In 1982, M. J. Akbar used to edit and design the daily newspaper; thus it had a major impact on newspaper journalism in India.

The Telegraph is published by media group Ananda Publishers closely associated with ABP Pvt. Ltd; the group also published Anandabazar Patrika (a Bengali language newspaper) since 13 March 1922.  Apart from newspapers the group even  published Bengali and English periodicals like Anandamela, Unish-Kuri, Sananda, Anandalok, Desh magazine, The Telegraph in Schools and Career.

Businessworld, which was initially  part of the ABP group, has been sold to Anurag Batra, of Exchange4Media and Vikram Jhunjhunwala, an investment banker for an undisclosed amount.

The paper currently has three editions Calcutta, South Bengal and North Bengal. Previous editions include Northeast edition (Guwahati split), Jharkhand edition (Jamshedpur and Ranchi splits), Patna and Bhubaneshwar editions. Bhubaneshwar & Patna Editions ceased on 14 December 2018 and Northeast and Jharkhand editions on 20 May 2020

Editorial stance 
According to an analysis of the major English language newspapers in India, during the run up to the 2014 Indian general election, the political coverage of The Telegraph was found to be less aligned in favor of the Bharatiya Janata Party and less negative of the Indian National Congress relative to that of The Times of India and the Hindustan Times.

In a 2020 Newslaundry article, the paper's coverage of the response to the COVID-19 pandemic by the central government and that of the Bengal government were contrasted; according to it the paper provided more critical coverage of the former and less of the latter in its editorials and frontpage headlines. In an interview to Outlook, The Telegraph editor R. Rajagopal rejected the conception that it was harsher on the former and soft of the latter, stating that the scope of the events decide the prominence they receive in the paper which is being noticed because only a few others are providing similar coverage and that the tendency among media outlets to seek a false balance just to be able to claim neutrality was detrimental to journalism.

See also
 List of newspapers in India by circulation
 List of newspapers in the world by circulation

References

External links
  
 The Telegraph (e-paper)
 

ABP Group
English-language newspapers published in India
Newspapers published in Kolkata
Daily newspapers published in India
Newspapers published in Patna
Publications established in 1982
1982 establishments in West Bengal